North Miami Community Schools is one of three school systems in Miami County, Indiana. Located in the northern part of Miami County, North Miami Community Schools is located just north of Denver, Indiana.

Schools

North Miami Elementary School 
North Miami Middle/High School

References

Education in Miami County, Indiana
School districts in Indiana